Bergpark Wilhelmshöhe is a landscape park in Kassel, Germany. Construction of the Bergpark, or "mountain park", began in 1689 at the behest of the Landgraves of Hesse-Kassel and took about 150 years. The park is open to the public today. Since 2013, it has been a UNESCO World Heritage Site because of its monumental Baroque architecture and its unique fountains and water features.

Geography

Location 

, a Stadtteil of Kassel in northern Hesse, is situated west of the city centre at the foot of the Habichtswald hill range. It is also known for Kassel-Wilhelmshöhe station on the Hanover–Würzburg high-speed railway line.

Description
At the summit of the park stands the Hercules monument, a 40-meter high pyramid with a 8.5-meter bronze statue of Hercules. Behind the monument, a series of reservoirs gather water, which passes through a complex series of channels, valves, aqueducts, and water-wheels as it flows from the monument down through the park. The water tumbles through a Baroque water theatre, grotto, fountains, two hydraulic organs and several waterfalls (including a Great Cascade that is 350 meters long) before arriving at the pond, with the Great Fountain. At about 50 meters (160 ft) high, the Great Fountain was the largest fountain in Europe at the time of its creation in 1767. Below the pond and Great Fountain, the water runs in to ponds and pools at the Wilhelmshöhe Palace, built for the Elector of Hesse William I in the late 18th century.

Hercules 

The Kassel Hercules is a copper statue depicting the ancient Greek demigod Heracles (Gr. Ηρακλής, German Herkules). It is a copy of the third century Farnese Hercules statue, created by Johann Jacob Anthoni, a goldsmith from Augsburg.

History 
Originally laid out in the Baroque style of the giardino all'italiana and the French formal garden, with water features running downhill in cascades to Schloss Wilhelmshöhe, it was later re-arranged into an English landscape garden.

In 1143, Canons Regular from Mainz established the Weißenstein monastery at the site of present-day Schloss Wilhelmshöhe, which was dissolved in the course of the Protestant Reformation. Landgrave Philip I of Hesse used the remaining buildings as a hunting lodge, largely rebuilt by his descendant Maurice of Hesse-Kassel from 1606 to 1610.

1696–1806 

The Bergpark came into being as a Baroque park under Landgrave Charles I of Hesse-Kassel. In 1701, the Italian architect  started the construction of the Hercules monument and the giant cascades. In 1785, Wilhelm (William) IX, Landgrave of Hesse started a large extension of the park, and the following year his architect, Simon Louis du Ry, designed the Neoclassical palace Schloss Wilhelmshöhe.

Meanwhile, the ideals of the landscaping changed from the French Baroque to the English garden. In 1793, Karl Steinhöfer added the Steinhöfer Waterfall to the water garden.

1806–1866 
Kassel became the capital of the newly created Kingdom of Westphalia, a vassal state of France, ruled by Napoleon's brother Jérôme Bonaparte.  He kept court at the palace of Wilhelmshöhe (which was renamed Napoleonshöhe) until 1813, after Napoleon's defeat and the restoration of the electorate. The king's Head Chamberlain and governor of Napoleonshöhe was Count Heinrich von Blumenthal. In 1826, William II, Elector of Hesse ordered the last large construction of the Bergpark Wilhelmshöhe, the grosser Wasserfall (Great Waterfall).

1866–1918 

Having sided with Austria in the Austro-Prussian War for supremacy in Germany, the principality was annexed by the Kingdom of Prussia in 1866. The Prussian administration united Nassau, Frankfurt and Hesse-Kassel into the new Prussian province of Hesse-Nassau. Kassel ceased to be a princely residence, the dynasty of the creators of the park ended.

In 1870, after the Battle of Sedan, French Emperor Napoleon III was sent as a prisoner to Schloss Wilhelmshöhe before going into exile in Britain. From 1899, German Emperor Wilhelm II, who went to school in Kassel, chose Wilhelmshöhe as his summer residence, which turned the castle and the park into a centre of European politics for the next two decades. After the armistice which ended World War I, the Oberste Heeresleitung led by Paul von Hindenburg organized and led the withdrawal and demobilization of the German troops from here from November 1918 to February 1919.

20th and 21st century 
Schloss Wilhelmshöhe was damaged by Allied bombs in World War II. From 1968 to 1974, it was rebuilt as an art museum. It houses a wallpaper collection, a collection of Graeco-Roman antiques, and a gallery of Old Masters paintings. The collection focuses on the 16th and 17th century, containing masterpieces by German, Italian, French and Spanish painters. It comprises the second-largest collection of Rembrandts in Germany. Rembrandt's famous "Saskia" and "The Man with the Slouch Hat" by Frans Hals are among them.

In 1972, the Chancellor of West Germany Willy Brandt and the Prime Minister of the German Democratic Republic Willi Stoph met in Schloss Wilhelmshöhe for negotiations between the two German states.

No extensions were made to the Park in the 20th century. Extensive renovations to the Hercules monument and cascades have been ongoing in the 21st century, and are still in progress; much of the monument continues to be shrouded in scaffolding.

Today
Bergpark Wilhelmshöhe is administrated by the State of Hesse and affiliated with the European Garden Heritage Network since 2009. On 23 June 2013 it was proclaimed as a World Heritage Site during the UNESCO meeting in Phnom Penh. It is part of the Museumslandschaft Hessen Kassel.

Evaluation
Art historian Georg Dehio (1850–1932), inspirator of the modern discipline of historic preservation, described the park as "possibly the most grandiose combination of landscape and architecture that the Baroque dared anywhere" ("vielleicht das Grandioseste, was irgendwo der Barock in Verbindung von Architektur und Landschaft gewagt hat.").

Literature 
 Giovanni Francesco Guerniero, Delineatio Montis, Cassel 1706
 Paul Heidelbach, Die Geschichte der Wilhelmshöhe. Klinkhardt & Biermann, Leipzig, 1909
 Horst Becker und Michael Karkosch, Park Wilhelmshöhe, Parkpflegewerk, Bad Homburg und Regensburg 2007, .
 Verwaltung der Staatlichen Schlösser und Gärten Hessen, ComputerWorks AG und Michael Karkosch, Kassel-Wilhelmshöhe, Gartendenkmalpflegerische Zielplanung mit VectorWorks Landschaft, Lörrach 2007.
 Bernd Modrow und Claudia Gröschel, Fürstliches Vergnügen, 400 Jahre Gartenkultur in Hessen, Verlag Schnell und Steiner, Bad Homburg und Regensburg 2002, .
 Michael Karkosch, Zeitreise in die Jahrhundertwende, Der Kaiserpark Wilhelmshöhe in Kassel, in: SehensWerte, Heft 4, Besuchermagazin der Verwaltung der Staatlichen Schlösser und Gärten Hessen, Bad Homburg 2008, S. 28f.
 Dunja Richter, Der Duft der großen weiten Welt, Wilhelminische Pflanzenhausarchitektur in Kassel, in: SehensWerte, Heft 4, Besuchermagazin der Verwaltung der Staatlichen Schlösser und Gärten Hessen, Bad Homburg 2008, S. 30.
 Michael Karkosch, Zurückgelassen in der Heimat, Erdmann – Lieblingsteckel Seiner Majestät, in: SehensWerte, Heft 4, Besuchermagazin der Verwaltung der Staatlichen Schlösser und Gärten Hessen, Bad Homburg 2008, S. 35.
 Siegfried Hoß, Kaiserliche Farbenpracht – neu entfacht!, in: SehensWerte, Heft 4, Besuchermagazin der Verwaltung der Staatlichen Schlösser und Gärten Hessen, Bad Homburg 2008, S. 42.
 Marianne Bolbach, Geschichte und soziale Bedeutung des Bergparks Wilhelmshöhe, Kassel 1988.
 Paul Heidelbach, Die Geschichte der Wilhelmshöhe, Leipzig 1909, Nachdruck, hrsg. v. Dieter Carl, Vellmar 2005.
 Alfred Hoffmann und Herrmann Mielke. Kassel – Schlosspark Wilhelmshöhe – Bäume und Sträucher, hrsg. v. d. Verwaltung der Staatlichen Schlösser und Gärten Hessen, Bad Homburg 1994 (3. überarbeitete Aufl.).
 Jutta Korsmeier, Wasserkünste im Schlosspark Wilhelmshöhe, hrsg. v. d. Verwaltung der Staatlichen Schlösser und Gärten Hessen, Bad Homburg und Regensburg 2000, .
 Helmut Sander, Das Herkules-Bauwerk in Kassel-Wilhelmshöhe, Kassel 1981.

Gallery

References

External links 

Bergpark Wilhelmshöhe : UNESCO Official Website
Website of Museumslandschaft Hessen Kassel
City Map Kassel – The water arts at the foot of the Hercules.
Stadtpanoramen.de – Panoramas of Bergpark & Schloss Wilhelmshöhe and the Hercules monument & cascades
Youtube – Illuminated water arts in Kassel at night
 Youtube – Water arts in Kassel
 

Buildings and structures in Kassel
Landmarks in Germany
Parks in Germany
Royal residences in Hesse
Protected areas of Hesse
Landgraviate of Hesse-Kassel
World Heritage Sites in Germany
Museumslandschaft Hessen Kassel